Fred Schreiner may refer to:

 Frank Schreiner (1879–1937), American water polo player
 Fred Schreiner (footballer) (born 1961), Luxembourgian football midfielder